Louis-Karim Nébati (born August 25, 1971) is a French actor, born in Bénouville (Calvados).

TV acting
2001 - 2006 : Fabien Cosma
2003 : Les femmes savantes
2004 : Léa Parker
2005 : Malone
2007 : 5 sur cinq

Theatre
 1994 : Meurtre de la princesse juive
 1995 : Folle Amanda
 from 1996 to 1998: La Vie en Rose
 from 1996 to 1998: Les femmes savantes

See also
  Agent
 

1971 births
Living people
People from Calvados (department)
French male television actors
French male stage actors
Cours Florent alumni